Glam Nation Live is the first live album by American singer Adam Lambert which was released on March 22, 2011, on DVD and CD formats. The concert was filmed at Clowes Hall in Indianapolis, Indiana during the North American leg of his Glam Nation Tour.

Track listing
17. Behind the Scenes

Source:

Chart performance
The album has sold a total of 24,000 copies in the United States as of April 13, 2011.

Charts

References

		 	

2011 live albums
Adam Lambert albums
2011 video albums
RCA Records live albums
RCA Records video albums
19 Recordings live albums
19 Recordings video albums
Live video albums